Ramnagar is a Township Area , in Ramnagar I CD block in Contai subdivision of Purba Medinipur district in the state of West Bengal, India.

Geography

CD block HQ
The headquarters of Ramnagar I CD block are located at Ramnagar.

Police station
Ramnagar police station is located at Talgachari. It has jurisdiction over Ramnagar I (part) and Ramnagar II CD blocks. It covers an area of 286.02 km2 with a population of  309,836.

Urbanisation
93.55% of the population of Contai subdivision live in the rural areas. Only 6.45% of the population live in the urban areas and it is considerably behind Haldia subdivision in urbanization, where 20.81% of the population live in urban areas.

Note: The map alongside presents some of the notable locations in the subdivision. All places marked in the map are linked in the larger full screen map.

Demographics
As per 2011 Census of India Ramnagar had a total population of 1,914 of which 964 (50%) were males and 950 (50%) were females. Population below 6 years was 196. The total number of literates in Ramnagar was 1,580 (91.97% of the population over 6 years).

Transport
SH 4 connecting Jhalda (in Purulia district) and Digha (in Purba Medinipur district) passes through Ramnagar. Egra-Ramnagar Road meets SH 4 at Ramnagar.

Ramnagar (Bengal) railway station is the nearest railway station on the Tamluk-Digha line,

References

Villages in Purba Medinipur district